Paolo Sardi (1 September 1934 – 13 July 2019) was an Italian cardinal of the Catholic Church who spent his career in the Roman Curia. He was patron of the Sovereign Military Order of Malta from 2009 to 2014.

Early life and priesthood
Sardi was born in Ricaldone, Province of Alessandria; his father was a farmer and his mother a schoolteacher. He studied at the local seminary of the Diocese of Acqui and then in Turin and Rome, where he earned a licentiate in theology from the Pontifical Gregorian University in 1958. Sardi was ordained a priest on 29 June 1958.

He graduated in canon law from the Gregorian in 1963 and completed a degree in jurisprudence at the Università Cattolica Milano in 1968. He taught moral theology in Turin until 1976, when he began his career in the Roman Curia, working in the Secretariat of State. In 1990, he was made manager of its Office of General Affairs. In 1992 he was appointed Vice Councillor for General Affairs.

Curial career
On 10 December 1996 Sardi was given the title Apostolic Nuncio with special responsibilities and appointed Titular Archbishop of Sutrium by Pope John Paul II. Sardi coordinated the Vatican office that writes and edits the pope's texts and addresses. On 6 January 1997, Pope John Paul consecrated him an archbishop in Saint Peter's Basilica. Among his pastoral duties while at the Secretariat, he for many years said Mass daily at the tomb of Pope John XXIII in St. Peter's. Sardi would serve as the speechwriter for John Paul II as well.

On 23 October 2004, Pope John Paul II appointed him Vice Camerlengo (chamberlain) of the Holy Roman Church. In this position he was one of a small number of Vatican officials to visit Pope John Paul in his last days.  He held that post until Santos Abril y Castelló was named to replace him on 22 January 2011. The role of vice camerlengo was in addition to his duties at the Secretariat; he complained to Pope Benedict about poor management there in 2009 and joked that, "I'm trying to see in these situations (which, to tell the truth, are numerous) the benevolent intervention of Providence, that wants to prepare me to leave the Secretariat without regrets".

He was appointed Pro-Patron of the Sovereign Military Order of Malta on 6 June 2009. On 30 November 2010, after he became a cardinal, his title changed from Pro-Patron to Patron of the Order of Malta. He held that position until 8 November 2014.

Cardinal
On 20 November 2010, Pope Benedict XVI created him Cardinal-Deacon of Santa Maria Ausiliatrice in Via Tuscolana.

On 29 December 2010 he was appointed a member of the Congregation for Institutes of Consecrated Life and for Societies of Apostolic Life; the Congregation for the Causes of Saints; and the Pontifical Council for the Laity. To this Pope Benedict added membership in the Supreme Tribunal of the Apostolic Signatura on 31 May 2011.

He was one of the cardinal electors who participated in the 2013 papal conclave that elected Pope Francis. One analysis of Vatican politics following that conclave described Sardi as "one of [Cardinal Tarcisio] Bertone's political adversaries within the Curia". In 2009 Sardi had complained to Pope Benedict about Vatican mismanagement when Bertone as Secretary of State was the Curia's most powerful figure, writing to Benedict that "for some time in various parts of the church, including among people extremely faithful to it, critical voices have been raised about the lack of coordination and confusion which reigns at its center".

Sardi died in Rome's Gemelli University Hospital  after a brief illness on 13 July 2019 at the age of 84. Bertone led his concelebrated funeral Mass in St. Peter's on 15 July; Pope Francis delivered the final commendation and blessing.

References

External links
 

1934 births
2019 deaths
People from the Province of Alessandria
20th-century Italian Roman Catholic titular archbishops
Diplomats of the Holy See
Cardinals created by Pope Benedict XVI
21st-century Italian cardinals
Pontifical Gregorian University alumni
Università Cattolica del Sacro Cuore alumni
Members of the Congregation for Institutes of Consecrated Life and Societies of Apostolic Life
Knights Grand Cross of the Order of Merit of the Italian Republic
Patrons of the Sovereign Military Order of Malta